The following is a list of notable events and releases that happened in 2011 in music in the United States.

Events

January
24 – Original Adema vocalist Mark Chavez leaves the band for the second time.
29 – Britney Spears's Hold It Against Me debuts at #1 on US Billboard Hot 100, making Spears the second artist to have more than one single to debut at no. 1, behind Mariah Carey. She also being the third female artist, behind Cher, Madonna and Janet Jackson to top the Hot 100 in three decades, as well as the seventh artist overall.

February
11 – Lady Gaga released "Born This Way" the first single off her new album of the same name. It became the fastest iTunes single at the time. It later went on to remain number 1 on the Billboard Hot 100 for 6 consecutive weeks, as well as the 1,000th number-one single in chart's history.
13 – The 53rd Annual Grammy Awards were held at Staples Center in Los Angeles, California. Lady Antebellum win five awards, including both Record of the Year and Song of the Year for "Need You Now". Arcade Fire's The Suburbs wins Album of the Year, while Esperanza Spalding wins Best New Artist.

March
11 – Kyuss begins their reunion tour in Europe under the moniker Kyuss Lives.
15 – Former rapper Nate Dogg dies at age 41 from strokes

April
3 – LCD Soundsystem plays its final show at New York City's Madison Square Garden.
 The Academy of Country Music Awards took place in at the MGM Grand Garden Arena in Las Vegas.
20 – TV on the Radio bassist Gerard Smith dies of lung cancer at the age of 36, just nine days after the band released their fourth album, Nine Types of Light.

May
10 – System of a Down began their first tour in 5 years in Edmonton.
12 – Katy Perry, with her fourth single from Teenage Dream, "E.T.", becomes the only artist in history to spend 52 consecutive weeks in the top ten of the Billboard Hot 100.
23 – Lady Gaga released her sophomore album, Born This Way. It sold 524,000 copies on its first day, and one million copies on its first week, making Gaga the first person to do that.
25 – Scotty McCreery is crowned winner of the tenth season of American Idol Lauren Alaina is runner-up.

June
18 – Clarence Clemons, Bruce Springsteen's longtime saxophonist for the E Street Band dies at the age of 69.
28 – Taking Back Sunday released their self-titled 5th album, which was the band's first album to feature their original lineup since their 2002 debut, Tell All Your Friends.
 Limp Bizkit released their first studio album in 8 years, Gold Cobra. It was the first album with the band's original lineup since 2000's Chocolate Starfish and the Hot Dog Flavored Water.
29 – Javier Colon won the inaugural season of The Voice. Dia Frampton was named runner-up. Vicci Martinez and Beverly McClellan was declared third and fourth place.

July
17 – Illinois rock band Cheap Trick is unharmed after a stage collapses during a performance at the Cisco Bluesfest in Ottawa, Ontario, Canada.
19 –  Cold released their first album in six years, Superfiction.

August
8 – Well-known hip-hop stars JAY Z and Kanye West release their highly anticipated collaboration album, Watch the Throne.
15 – Blink-182 start their 20th Anniversary Tour. The tour visited Canada in 2011, the United States and Europe in 2012 and Australia in 2013.
27 – "Last Friday Night (T.G.I.F.)" by Katy Perry becomes the fifth single from the album Teenage Dream to reach #1 on the Billboard Hot 100, tying Michael Jackson's record for the most singles from one album to do so. She is the second artist and only woman in history to achieve this.
29 –  Red Hot Chili Peppers released their first album in five years, I'm with You.

September
2 – It was announced that drummer Mike Pedicone was kicked out of My Chemical Romance due to Pedicone stealing from the band. No charges were pressed.
17 – With Katy Perry's fifth single from Teenage Dream, "Last Friday Night (T.G.I.F.)", she completed 69 consecutive weeks inside the top ten, more than any artist in history.
21 – Rock and Roll Hall of Famers R.E.M. disband after 31 years together. They played their last show in 2008.
24 – "I Wanna Go" by Britney Spears became Spears's 21st top-forty single, the third-highest female total since her first week on the chart on November 21, 1998, and only behind Taylor Swift with 27 and Rihanna with 22. It also broke the record for longest duration between the first and last # 1 on the pop chart.
27 – Blink-182 released their sixth studio album Neighborhoods. This is the first album they recorded together since their indefinite hiatus in 2005. It debuted at number 2 on the Billboard 200. This is their last album with Tom DeLonge.

October
8 - Tony Bennett's Duets II debuted at No. 1 on the Billboard 200, becoming the oldest male with a No. 1 solo album, at age 85.

November
1 - Canadian teen pop/R&B singer Justin Bieber released his Christmas album and second studio album, Under the Mistletoe
9 - The Country Music Association Awards took place at the Bridgestone Arena in Nashville, Tennessee.
7 – David Lynch released his first album in ten years, Crazy Clown Time.
21 - Pentatonix wins Season 3 of NBC's The Sing-Off, beginning their rise in popularity.

December
6 – Korn's tenth studio album, The Path of Totality, debuts at number 10 on the Billboard 200 with 55,000 copies sold in its first week. This album marks the beginning of a new direction for nu metal, with artists like Skrillex and many more contributing to the album with dub step and more electronic sounds. Cimorelli also releases their second EP The CimFam EP

Bands formed

 5 Seconds of Summer
 Adrenaline Mob
 Art of Anarchy
 Banks & Steelz
 Big Talk
 Chris Robinson Brotherhood
 Crosses
 Deap Vally
 DIIV
 Downtown Boys
 Empress Of
 Foxing
 A Great Big World
 The Internet
 The Milk Carton Kids
 Modern Baseball
 The Moth & The Flame
 MS MR
 The Neighbourhood
 Ninja Sex Party
 Nothing
 Pentatonix
 Pistol Annies
 Poliça
 The Record Company
 Rozwell Kid
 Speedy Ortiz
 SuperHeavy
 Tremonti
 Waxahatchee
 Young Buffalo
Your Favorite Martian

Bands reformed
 Bad Meets Evil
 Ben Folds Five
Blink-182
 Evanescence
 Gym Class Heroes
 Dispatch
 Grant Lee Buffalo
 Live
 O-Town
 System of a Down
 Five Iron Frenzy

Bands on hiatus
 Atreyu
 The Black Eyed Peas
 Disturbed
 Good Charlotte
 Idiot Pilot
 Iglu & Hartly
 Innerpartysystem
 Jonas Brothers
 Nevermore
 Sonic Youth
 The Spill Canvas
 Story of the Year
 Thrice
 Thursday
 Velvet Revolver
 Tally Hall

Bands disbanded

 The Academy Is...
 Anal Cunt
 Big Star
 The Bravery
 Buckner & Garcia
 The Depreciation Guild
 Double Dagger
 Draco and the Malfoys
 The Famine
 The Graduate
 Haste the Day
 LCD Soundsystem
 Monty Are I
 Nick Jonas & the Administration
 Pontytail
 P.S. Eliot
 pureNRG
 R.E.M.
 Rilo Kiley
 SHeDAISY
 The Takeover UK
 Trachtenburg Family Slideshow Players
 The Von Bondies
 The White Stripes

Albums released

January

February

March

April

May

June

July

August

September

October

November

December

Top songs on record

Billboard Hot 100 No. 1 Songs
 "Black and Yellow" – Wiz Khalifa (1 week)
 "Born This Way"- Lady Gaga (6 weeks)
 "E.T." – Katy Perry feat. Kanye West (5 weeks)
 "Firework" – Katy Perry (2 weeks in 2010, 2 weeks in 2011)
 "Give Me Everything" – Pitbull feat. Ne-Yo, Afrojack, and Nayer (1 week)
 "Grenade" – Bruno Mars (4 weeks)
 "Hold It Against Me" – Britney Spears (1 week)
 "Last Friday Night (T.G.I.F.)" – Katy Perry (2 weeks)
 "Moves Like Jagger" – Maroon 5 feat. Christina Aguilera (4 weeks)
 "Party Rock Anthem" – LMFAO feat. Lauren Bennett and GoonRock (6 weeks)
 "Rolling in the Deep" – Adele (7 weeks)
 "S&M" – Rihanna  (1 week)
 "Someone Like You" – Adele (5 weeks)
 "We Found Love" – Rihanna feat. Calvin Harris (8 weeks in 2011, 2 weeks in 2012)

Billboard Hot 100 Top 20 Hits
All songs that reached the Top 20 on the Billboard Hot 100 chart during the year, complete with peak chart placement.

Deaths

January 1 – Charles Fambrough, 60, jazz bassist, composer and record producer
January 7 – Bobby Robinson, 93, record producer and songwriter
January 9 – Debbie Friedman, 59, singer-songwriter
January 10 – Margaret Whiting, 86, singer
January 14 – Georgia Carroll, 91, singer, actress and model
January 17 – Don Kirshner, 76, record producer, music publisher, and songwriter
January 19 – James O'Gwynn, 82, singer
January 21 – Tony Geiss, 86, television writer and composer (Sesame Street)
January 22 – Bobby Poe, 77, singer, songwriter, and record producer
January 24 – Barrie Lee Hall, Jr., 61, trumpeter and band leader
January 26
Gladys Horton, 65, singer (The Marvelettes)
Charlie Louvin, 83, singer-songwriter and guitarist (The Louvin Brothers)
January 27 – Don Rondo, 81, singer
January 29
Milton Babbitt, 94, composer
Emanuel Vardi, 95, violist
January 31 – Doc Williams, 96, country music performer
February 8 – Marvin Sease, 64, blues and soul singer-songwriter
February 10 – Blanche Honegger Moyse, 101, conductor 
February 12 – Betty Garrett, 91, singer and actress
February 14 – John Strauss, 90, television and film composer
February 16 – David Shapiro, 58, jazz musician
February 20 – Eddie Brandt, 90, composer and songwriter
February 22
Beau Dollar (69), soul-R&B singer and drummer
Jean Dinning, 86, singer and songwriter (The Dinning Sisters)
February 24 – Eddie Serrato, 65, drummer (? and the Mysterians)
February 25 – Rick Coonce, 64, drummer (The Grass Roots)
February 26 – Mark Tulin, 62, bassist (The Electric Prunes)
February 27 – Eddie Kirkland, 87, blues musician
March 8
St. Clair Lee, 66, singer (The Hues Corporation)
Mike Starr, 44, bassist (Alice in Chains)
March 10 – Eddie Snyder, 92, songwriter
March 11 – Hugh Martin, 96, songwriter
March 15 – Nate Dogg, 41, rapper, singer, and actor
March 17 – Ferlin Husky, 85, country music singer
March 21 – Loleatta Holloway, 64, singer
March 23
Ken Arcipowski, 66, singer (Randy & the Rainbows)
Henry Jerome, 93, big band leader, trumpeter, arranger, composer
March 24 – Rozetta Johnson, c. 68, soul and gospel singer
March 29 – Ray Herr, 63, rock guitarist (The Ides of March)
March 31 – Mel McDaniel, 68, country music singer-songwriter
April 9 – Orrin Tucker, 100, bandleader
April 20 – Gerard Smith, 36, bassist (TV on the Radio)
April 23
Tom King, 68, guitarist and songwriter (The Outsiders)
Peter Lieberson, 64, classical composer
April 26 – Phoebe Snow, 60, singer-songwriter
May 3 – Odell Brown, 70, jazz organist
May 13 – Bernard Greenhouse, 95, cellist
May 27 – Gil Scott-Heron, 62, singer, instrumentalist, poet, and author
June 2 – Ray Bryant, 79, jazz pianist and composer
June 3 – Benny Spellman, 79, singer
June 4 – David "Frankie" Toler, 59, drummer (The Allman Brothers Band) 
June 18 – Clarence Clemons, 69, saxophone player for Bruce Springsteen's E Street Band
July 11 – Rob Grill, 67, singer-songwriter and bass player (The Grass Roots) 
July 15 – Cornell MacNeil, 88, operatic baritone
July 24 – Dan Peek, 60, singer-songwriter (America)
July 29
Jack Barlow, 87, country music singer and songwriter
Gene McDaniels, 76, singer-songwriter
August 10 – Billy Grammer, 85, country singer
August 11 – Jani Lane, 47, glam rock singer (Warrant)
August 22 – Jerome "Jerry" Leiber, 78, songwriter and record producer
August 29 – Fred Farran, 74, pop singer (The Arbors)
September 21 – John Larson, 61, trumpeter (The Ides of March)
September 27 – Johnny "Country" Mathis, 80, country music singer and songwriter (Jimmy & Johnny)
October 3 – Kay Armen, 95, singer
October 8 – Mikey Welsh, 40, bassist (Weezer)
October 12 – Joel DiGregorio, 67, keyboardist (The Charlie Daniels Band)
November 7 – Andrea True, 68, porn performer and singer
November 8
Heavy D, 44, rapper, singer, record producer, and actor
Jimmy Norman, 74, musician and songwriter
November 17 – Gary Garcia, 63, musician and songwriter (Buckner & Garcia)
November 25 – Coco Robicheaux, 64, singer-songwriter and guitarist 
December 3 – Ronald Mosley, 72, singer (Ruby & the Romantics)
December 6 – Dobie Gray, 71, singer-songwriter
December 7 – Bob Burnett, 71, folk musician (The Highwaymen)
December 14 – Billie Jo Spears, 74, country music singer
December 18 – Ralph MacDonald, 67, percussionist and songwriter
December 20 – Sean Bonniwell, 71, rock singer, songwriter and guitarist (The Music Machine)

See also
 2010s in music
 2011 in American television
 Timeline of musical events

References